The Zenair Zenith CH 200 and CH 250 are a family of Canadian single-engined homebuilt light aircraft. It is a low-winged single engine monoplane, that was first flown in France in 1970, with kits being made by the Canadian company Zenair from 1974, with hundreds built and flown.

Development and design
In October 1968, the French aeronautical engineer Chris Heintz, who worked for Avions Pierre Robin, started work on the design of a two-seat all-metal light aircraft suitable for amateur construction, the Zenith, with the prototype making its maiden flight on 22 March 1970.

Heintz migrated to Canada in 1973, and set up Zenair in 1974 to sell plans and kits of the Zénith. The Zenith, which gained the designation Zenith CH 200 when Heintz produced plans for larger and smaller derivatives, is a low-winged cantilever monoplane of all metal construction. The pilot and passenger sit side by side under a clear, sideways-opening plexiglas canopy, while the aircraft is fitted with a fixed nosewheel undercarriage. It is designed to be powered by a single piston engine of between 85 and 160 hp (63.5 and 119 kW).

The first Zenith to be built in North America flew in October 1975, and by 1976, over 300 plans had been sold. Plans continued to be available in 1999, by which time hundreds were flying.

At the 1976 EAA Convention in Oshkosh, Wisconsin the factory used volunteer labour to build and fly a CH 200 in eight days, using 550 person-hours.

Variants

Zenair CH 200
Initial version. The aircraft can be constructed as a taildragger or on tricycle gear and flown as a skiplane or on floats.
Zenair CH 250
Improved version with more fuel, larger baggage area, rear windows and a forward sliding canopy.
Zenair CH 250 TD
"Tail Dragger" version with conventional landing gear.

Specifications (100 hp engine)

See also

Notes

References

Gunston, Bill. World Encyclopedia of Aircraft Manufacturers. Second edition. Stroud, UK:Sutton Publishing, 2005. .
Taylor, John W. R. Jane's All The World's Aircraft 1976-77. London:Jane's Yearbooks, 1976. .
Taylor, John W. R. Jane's All The World's Aircraft 1982-83. London:Jane's Yearbooks, 1982. .
Taylor, Michael J. H. Brassey's World Aircraft & Systems Directory 1999/2000. London:Brassey's, 1999. .

1970s Canadian sport aircraft
Homebuilt aircraft
CH 200
Single-engined tractor aircraft
Low-wing aircraft
Aircraft first flown in 1970